An election to Dublin Corporation took place in March 1899 as part of that year's Irish local elections.

Before the next regular local elections, the jurisdiction of the city of Dublin was expanded under the Dublin Corporation Act 1900. Elections were held for 20 additional seats in this area at the 1901 Dublin Corporation election.

Background
The election, being the first following the 1898 changes to Irish local government, saw substantive changes to the franchise. Prior to these changes, the franchise had been restricted to males over the age of 21 who had maintained a continual residence within the borough for the preceding 2 years and 8 months, thereby preventing Dublin's large lodger and floating tenement population from voting. As a result of the changes the franchise increased from 7,964 in the previous elections to 38,719. Among these voters were 6,500 women who could vote for the first time.

Contest
The 60 seats for election were contested by 120 candidates; 18 Unionists, 10 Labourites, 88 Nationalists, and 1 representative of the Irish Socialist Republican Party.

This was the first time representatives of organised Labour participated in their own right, fighting under the banner of the Labour Electoral Association. Previously the Labour interest had been represented by Nationalist "Labour" spokespersons. That being said, the party only contested 10 of Dublins 60 seats, meaning the party did not even put forward 1 candidate per ward.

Results
The election saw the Redmonites, who had previously dominated the council, substantially reduced. The Redmonites had previously held 44 of the 60 seats in the old council. Following the election the Redmonites held only 18. United Irish League representation increased substantially to 27. Labour representation increased from 3 to 8, whilst Unionist representation declined to 7.

Results by party

Results by ward

Arran Quay Ward

Fitzwilliam Ward

References

Sources

Citations

1899 Irish local elections
1899